Turkey competed at the 2019 World Aquatics Championships in Gwangju, South Korea from 12 to 28 July.

Artistic swimming

Turkey entered four artistic swimmers.

Women

Mixed

Swimming

Turkey entered 15 swimmers.

Men

Women

Mixed

References

Nations at the 2019 World Aquatics Championships
Turkey at the World Aquatics Championships
2019 in Turkish sport